Queen Elizabeth Bridge is a road crossing over the River Dee in Aberdeen, Scotland. It carries a dual carriageway (part of the A956 route) and pavements on either side.

History 

In 1978, Grampian Regional Council approached the Scottish Development Department with a view to constructing the bridge as a replacement for the Wellington Suspension Bridge. The estimated cost at the time was £2 million.

During construction, the bridge was referred to as the New Wellington Bridge. The bridge opened to traffic in December 1983. In April 1984, the bridge was named Queen Elizabeth Bridge. The bridge was officially opened by Elizabeth II on 10 August 1984.

Structure 

References 

Bridges in Aberdeen
Road bridges in Scotland
Bridges completed in 1983
1984 establishments in Scotland